Kate Smith (1907–1986) was an American singer.

Kate Smith may also refer to:

Kate Wilson-Smith (born 1979), Australian badminton player
Kate Smith (presenter), former Northern Irish television presenter and journalist
Kate Smith (diplomat), former British ambassador to Greece
Kate Mary Smith (1847–1932), businesswoman from Brisbane, Queensland

See also
Katie Smith (born 1974), American basketball player and coach
Katherine Smith (disambiguation)
Kathleen Smith (disambiguation)
Kathy Smith (disambiguation)